CO2 is an Italian opera by Giorgio Battistelli which premiered at La Scala on May 16, 2015. It is based on Al Gore's documentary An Inconvenient Truth, and Gore was initially a character in the opera. The libretto, primarily in English but containing passages in other languages, was written by Robert Carsen, who directed the production, and Ian Burton.

Works with similar themes
Anthropocene (opera) 2019 by Stuart MacRae
Auksalaq (opera) 2012 by Matthew Burtner

References 

Environmental mass media
Operas
Operas based on films
2015 operas
English-language operas
Opera world premieres at La Scala